George Nganyuo Elokobi (born 31 January 1986) is a Cameroonian former professional footballer who played as a defender and is interim manager at Maidstone United.

Elokobi moved from his native Cameroon to England at the age of 16, where he entered non-League football with Dulwich Hamlet. After a trial period, he was signed by Colchester United. He was loaned to Chester City in January 2005, where he made his professional debut, before going on to make 46 appearances for Colchester. He was signed by Wolverhampton Wanderers in January 2008, helping the club to promotion to the Premier League. He established himself as a regular in the first-team between 2009 and 2011, before he was loaned to Nottingham Forest for the second half of the 2011–12 season, making twelve league appearances. He was loaned out to Bristol City in September 2012, but suffered a near season-ending injury on his debut when he fractured his ankle. He fell out of favour at Wolves, and at the end of the 2013–14 season he was released, joining Oldham Athletic. He spent one season with Oldham before returning to Colchester United in 2015. He had a spell at National League side Braintree Town on loan from Colchester in 2016. He joined Leyton Orient in July 2017 and was released on his 33rd birthday. On 12 February 2019, Elokobi signed for fellow National League side Aldershot Town. before moving on to Maidstone at the end of the year as a player/academy coach.

During his career he won promotion four times and scored in every division from the Premier League to National League South.

Early years
Born in Mamfe, Cameroon, Elokobi was aged just eleven years old when he lost both his father (to diabetes) and his grandfather. He went to live with his grandmother the same year, while his mother moved to England to study. When she gained her qualifications, she found work and was able to send her son to "one of the best boarding schools in Cameroon". At the age of 16, Elokobi moved to London to join her, where he attended college, studying business, IT and sociology.

Club career

Colchester United
Shortly after his arrival in England in 2002, Elokobi joined the youth scheme at Isthmian League Division One side Dulwich Hamlet. It was here that he was spotted by Colchester United scouts. He was offered a trial at the end of the 2003–04 season, before becoming Phil Parkinson's fourth summer signing on 29 June 2004.

Chester City loan
Elokobi did not feature for Colchester's first-team in his first season with the club, but he was loaned to League Two Chester City for one month in January 2005, working under Ian Rush. He made his professional debut for Chester on 29 January 2005, starting in their 3–0 defeat to Swansea City at Vetch Field. On his fifth and final appearance for the club on 26 February, he was sent off for fouling Luke Rodgers in the penalty area during a 5–0 defeat away to Shrewsbury Town.

2005–06 season
Despite failing to make a first-team appearance for Colchester during the 2004–05 season, Elokobi was rewarded with a new deal to remain at the club after making the substitutes bench for a number of games towards the end of the season. He eventually made his U's debut on 24 August 2005 in their 2–0 defeat to Cardiff City in the League Cup at Layer Road. He replaced Pat Baldwin after 78 minutes of play. He made his first league start three days later as Colchester were held to a 0–0 draw by Oldham Athletic. He then scored his first professional goal on 24 September with the opener at home against Huddersfield Town in a 1–1 draw.

Elokobi was ruled out of action through much of October and November 2005 after being diagnosed with mumps. He returned to action on 23 November in Colchester's 3–2 extra time win against Northampton Town in the Football League Trophy, where he scored the U's equalising goal at 1–1 in the 57th minute of the tie. He made a total of twelve League One appearances across the season, with a further five in cup competitions, as he helped his side to second place in the table and promotion to the Championship.

2006–07 season
After starting both opening fixtures of Colchester's maiden season in the second tier of English football, a suspension earned after being sent off in a reserve game meant that Elokobi was displaced by Cardiff City loanee Chris Barker, who retained the left-back position for much of the season. He made just ten league appearances over the course of the campaign.

2007–08 season
Holding off competition from Danny Granville and securing the left-back position for himself in the early stages of the 2007–08 season, Elokobi's performances and three registered assists had seen him linked with a move to Scottish side Celtic in September 2008, but Elokobi said that it was "nice to get the recognition... but it will not affect my football and I will keep working hard". After making 14 appearances, Elokobi handed in a transfer request in November 2007, stating that he had no intention of re-signing for the club once his contract expired in the summer of 2008. With the club yet to receive an offer for the player, he made his first start since handing in his transfer request on 1 December. He scored what would prove to be the decisive goal and his final Colchester goal in the 2–1 win against Sheffield Wednesday at Hillsborough. Following the game, Elokobi insisted that he would "give 100 per cent for the club" while still with Colchester. He played his final game for the U's in a 3–1 FA Cup home defeat by Peterborough United on 5 January 2008, having made 18 appearances in all competitions.

Wolverhampton Wanderers
Elokobi's transfer request at Colchester alerted fellow Championship club Wolverhampton Wanderers to sign him on 31 January 2008 for an undisclosed fee on a -year deal, later revealed to be £500,000. He made his debut in Wolves' 0–0 draw at Blackpool on 12 February, and quickly became a regular in the starting eleven, making 15 appearances from his debut until the end of the season.

2008–09 season
Continuing how the previous season ended, Elokobi began the 2008–09 campaign as a regular starter under Mick McCarthy's stewardship, making three consecutive appearances from the opening day of the season. However, in the fourth game of the season, a trip to Portman Road to face Ipswich Town on 23 August 2008, Elokobi suffered a serious knee ligament injury that was expected to rule him out for the remainder of the season. During his injury lay-off, Elokobi was handed a new deal with the club as they surged to the Championship league title and earned promotion to the Premier League. He returned from injury faster than expected, as he was able to make a late substitute appearance in the 1–0 home win over Doncaster Rovers on the final day of the season to lift the Championship trophy.

2009–10 season
Elokobi made his Premier League bow as a half-time substitute for former Colchester United teammate Greg Halford in Wolves' 1–0 defeat to Manchester City at the City of Manchester Stadium on 22 August 2009. He made 26 appearances over the course of the 2009–10 season, which was enough to earn him a new three-year deal in August 2010.

2010–11 season
Elokobi scored his first Wolves goal on 26 October 2010 during a 3–2 League Cup defeat to Manchester United at Old Trafford. He scored Wolves' first goal to draw the scoreline level at 1–1 on 60 minutes. On 8 January 2011, he received only his second-ever red card when he was sent off for a reckless tackle on Doncaster Rovers' James Coppinger after 77 minutes of the 2–2 FA Cup draw. He played 32 games played during the season as Wolves narrowly avoided relegation despite defeat.

2011–12 season
After being utilised intermittently during the beginning of Wolves' 2011–12 Premier League campaign, Elokobi struck his first goal of the season on 20 September 2011 in a 5–0 League Cup win over Millwall. After struggling to hold down a regular first team place with just three starts in eight Premier League games, Elokobi was made available for loan in February 2012.

Nottingham Forest loan
Championship side Nottingham Forest signed Elokobi in an emergency loan deal on 9 February 2012, with Wolverhampton Wanderers hoping the move would give Elokobi a chance to play some games. The loan move would last until the end of the Championship season on 28 April. He made his debut on 11 February in Forest's 1–1 home draw with Watford. He went on to make twelve appearances to help steer Forest clear from relegation to League One, while his parent club were relegated to the Championship. Impressed by his performances during his short stay, Nottingham Forest were linked with a permanent transfer for Elokobi in July 2012, but a move never materialised.

2012–13 season
Elokobi returned to the Wolves squad for their 2012–13 season in the Championship as a substitute for David Edwards in their 1–1 draw with Derby County on 25 August 2012. However, Elokobi fell out of favour under new manager Ståle Solbakken who preferred Kevin Foley in covering the left-back role, and with Solbakken stating that his squad was three to four players too large, Elokobi was made available for loan.

Bristol City loan
Bristol City signed Elokobi on a 93-day emergency loan on 26 September 2012 as cover for Greg Cunningham who had been ruled out of action for two months with an ankle injury. He made his debut on 29 September during City's 3–2 home defeat to Leeds United, but he suffered what was thought to be another season-ending injury after he fractured and dislocated his ankle 43 minutes into his debut. His loan was immediately terminated with the player undergoing surgery.

He returned to action for Wolves earlier than expected once again, featuring in the final game of the season defeat to Brighton & Hove Albion which confirmed a second successive relegation for the club.

2013–14 season
Ahead of the 2013–14 season, Elokobi took up a one-year contract extension option to remain with Wolves until the end of the season. Manager Kenny Jackett told Elokobi he would offer the player a "fresh start", but after enduring another frustrating season where he made just nine appearances in all competitions, the club decided not to offer him a new contract, and he made his final appearance in a testimonial match for Jody Craddock at the end of the campaign.

Oldham Athletic
Following his release from Wolverhampton Wanderers, Elokobi signed a one-year contract with League One side Oldham Athletic on 8 August 2014. He made his debut the following day as an 80th-minute substitute for James Dayton during Oldham's 2–2 draw with Elokobi's former club Colchester United at Colchester Community Stadium. He suffered a thigh injury during a 3–2 win over Scunthorpe United on 27 September that ruled him out of action for all of October and almost all of November 2014.

On his return, Elokobi was a regular feature in Lee Johnson's starting line-up, and he then scored his first goal for the club on 26 December with a header from a corner kick in a 2–1 home defeat by Crewe Alexandra. After Johnson departed the club, Elokobi fell out of favour with his replacement Dean Holden, making just one substitute appearance between his departure on 25 February until the end of the season. His season ended with three goals in 27 appearances.

With his contract expiring, the club offered Elokobi a new contract on reduced terms, but after rejecting the offer, he decided to leave the club.

Return to Colchester United
Colchester United re-signed Elokobi on a two-year contract on 3 July 2015 after a seven-year absence. After spending much of pre-season out of contention through injury, Elokobi made his second debut for Colchester during their 4–0 away defeat to Fleetwood Town on 22 August. He replaced Richard Brindley after 57 minutes when his side were 3–0 down. On his first start for the club on 29 August, Elokobi scored the equalising goal in Colchester's 2–2 draw with Scunthorpe United at the Colchester Community Stadium.

Elokobi received his first red card of his combined Colchester United career on 15 September when, while already on a yellow card, he brought down Sheffield United striker Billy Sharp in the penalty area in the 86th minute with the score at 3–2 to Colchester. The resultant penalty was saved by Colchester goalkeeper Jamie Jones, and the side went on to win the match. Elokobi scored two goals and made 19 appearances in the 2015–16 season.

Braintree Town loan
Out of favour under new Colchester manager John McGreal, Elokobi was made available for loan in August 2016. He joined National League side Braintree Town in a month-long loan deal on 4 October 2016. He made his Braintree debut the same day in their 2–1 home defeat by Boreham Wood. He scored twice in Braintree's 7–0 FA Cup first round win over Eastbourne Borough on 5 November.

Return to Colchester
Elokobi was recalled from his loan at Braintree on 22 November and went straight into Colchester's squad for their match against Cheltenham Town the same day. He made his first start of the season and helped the U's end their eleven-game winless run in League Two with a 3–0 win. He scored his first goal of the season in Colchester's 1–0 win at home to Wycombe Wanderers on 21 February 2017. He became ever-present until the end of the season, playing 29 League Two games. He left the club at the end of his contract after failing to agree a new deal.

Leyton Orient
On 14 July 2017, Elokobi signed a two-year contract with National League side Leyton Orient. On 31 January 2019 it was announced that he had left the club by mutual consent  having been placed on the transfer list ten days earlier.

Aldershot Town
On 12 February 2019, Elokobi signed for National League side Aldershot Town on a deal until the end of the season.

Maidstone United
Elokobi left Aldershot at the end of the season and then joined Maidstone United on a 1-year contract. 

Elokobi's final season with the club saw him gain a fourth career promotion as Maidstone won the 2021–22 National League South title. He scored in the final game of his career on 7 May in a 2–1 win against Hampton & Richmond Borough.

Retirement 
On 3 May 2022, Elokobi announced he would retire from playing professional football at the end of the season on Twitter.

International career
Elokobi was first called up for the Cameroon national team in November 2010 for a training camp in France in December 2010 in preparation for 2012 Africa Cup of Nations qualifying games. He was again called-up ahead of a qualifying game with Senegal in March 2011, replacing the injured Gaëtan Bong, but was an unused substitute in the match. He was also set to play in a friendly against Gabon in France three days later, but the game was cancelled with no official reason announced for the cancellation.

Coaching Career
Following the departure of Hakan Hayrettin in January 2023, Elokobi was appointed caretaker manager of Maidstone United.

Career statistics

Managerial statistics

Honours
Colchester United
League One runner-up: 2005–06

Wolverhampton Wanderers
Championship champion: 2008–09
League One champion: 2013–14

Maidstone United
National League South champion: 2021–22

References

External links
George Elokobi profile at the official Colchester United F.C. website

1986 births
Living people
Cameroonian footballers
Cameroonian expatriate footballers
Expatriate footballers in England
Association football fullbacks
Dulwich Hamlet F.C. players
Colchester United F.C. players
Chester City F.C. players
Wolverhampton Wanderers F.C. players
Nottingham Forest F.C. players
Bristol City F.C. players
Oldham Athletic A.F.C. players
Braintree Town F.C. players
Leyton Orient F.C. players
Aldershot Town F.C. players
Maidstone United F.C. players
Premier League players
English Football League players
Isthmian League players
National League (English football) players
Maidstone United F.C. managers
National League (English football) managers